Hehe Xiexie, or Hehe, Xiexie, is an outdoor 2009–2010 sculpture created by Zhang Huan as part of Art for the World, a collection of twenty monumental sculptures along the Expo Axis organised by Jean-Gabriel Mitterrand, for Expo 2010. It is still installed at Expo Boulevard in Shanghai, China.

A reduced version is presented at Sherbrooke street, Montréal, in Canada.

Description and reception
Hehe Xiexie depicts two "cuddly" Giant pandas which, according to Huan, represent a "harmonious society, harmonious world [and] harmonious Expo." They are made of mirror-finished stainless steel and measure  x  x  and  x  x . They were manufactured by Zhang Huan Studio and donated by Tomson Group as part of the Collection World Expo.

CNN Travel's Jessica Beaton and Hunter Braithwaite called the piece a "great" and "harmonious" photo opportunity.

See also
 2010 in art

References

External links

 Hehe Xiexie at ZhangHuan.com
 art for the world the city of forking paths (August 1, 2010), Designboom
 Hehe, Xiexie  at ShanghaiArt.org

2010 establishments in China
2010 sculptures
Animal sculptures in China
Expo 2010
Outdoor sculptures in Shanghai
Pudong
Sculptures of bears
Stainless steel sculptures
Statues in China
Steel sculptures in China